John Mooring (born May 8, 1947) is a former American football tackle and center. He played for the New York Jets from 1971 to 1973 and for the New Orleans Saints in 1974.

References

1947 births
Living people
American football tackles
American football centers
Tampa Spartans football players
New York Jets players
New Orleans Saints players